Espadilla is a municipality in the comarca of Alto Mijares in the Valencian Community, Spain.

References

Municipalities in the Province of Castellón